Strangers with Candy is a 2005 American comedy film directed by Paul Dinello, written by Dinello, Stephen Colbert, Amy Sedaris, and Mitch Rouse, and serves as a prequel to their 1999-2000 Comedy Central television series of the same name. Colbert co-produced the film alongside executive producer David Letterman. The film grossed $2.3 million.

Plot
46-year-old former high school dropout and self-described "junkie whore" Jerri Blank is released from prison and returns to her childhood home. She discovers her mother has died, her father, Guy, has remarried to the hateful Sara Blank, and she has an arrogant half-brother Derrick. To make matters worse, her father is in a "stress-induced coma". Taking the suggestion of the family doctor literally, Jerri decides to pick her life back up where she left it, beginning her high school all over again as a freshman at Flatpoint High.

Jerri joins Chuck Noblet's science fair team, the Fig Neutrons, along with her new friends, Megawatti Sucarnaputri (a spoof on Megawati Sukarnoputri) and Tammi Littlenut. Noblet is not pleased to learn that Principal Onyx Blackman has hired a ringer for their team, Roger Beekman, to ensure that Flatpoint wins, and so Noblet creates a second team. As she struggles to fit in and make her teammates proud, Jerri discovers that though the faces may have changed, the hassles of high school are just the same.

Cast

 Amy Sedaris as Geraldine Antonia "Jerri" Blank
 Stephen Colbert as Chuck Noblet
 Paul Dinello as Geoffrey Jellineck
 Dan Hedaya as Guy Blank
 Joseph Cross as Derrick Blank
 Deborah Rush as Sara Blank
 Maria Thayer as Tamela "Tammi" Littlenut
 Carlo Alban as Megawatti Sukarnoputri
 Gregory Hollimon as Principal Onyx Blackman
 Allison Janney as Alice
 Matthew Broderick as Roger Beekman
 Sarah Jessica Parker as Peggy Callas
 Philip Seymour Hoffman as Henry
 Justin Theroux as Carlo Honklin
 Chris Pratt as Brason
 Delores Duffy as Iris Puffybush
 Kristen Johnston as Coach Divers
 David Pasquesi as Stew
 Ian Holm as Dr. Putney
 David Rakoff as Boswell
 Elisabeth Harnois as Monica
 Alexis Dziena as Melissa
 Thomas Guiry as P John
 Evelyn McGee as Clair Noblet
 Jonah Bobo (uncredited) as Seamus Noblet
 Ryan Donowho (uncredited) as Stanley
 Christopher Larkin (uncredited) as Kim
 Todd Oldham (uncredited) as Mr. Oldham

Production

Development
Sedaris admitted in an interview that they never intended on making a film after the series was cancelled, explaining, "Paul, Steve, and I were working on our book Wigfield ... We kept coming up with funny Jerri Blank stuff to say, so it would go into a file, and by the end of the book, Paul opened the file and there was all this Blank stuff, and he said, 'Oh, it would be so funny to write a movie.' That's really how it happened."

Casting
 Orlando Pabotoy looked too old to reprise his series role as Orlando Pinatubo. His character was then replaced by the similar Megawatti Sukarnoputri.
 Larc Spies did not return for the role of Derrick because, according to Sedaris, "he looks like a longshoreman now." Several other characters were recast because the original actors looked too old to believably play high schoolers. The only original student to return was Thayer as redhead Tammi Littlenut.
 Roberto Gari did not reprise the role of Guy, who was instead portrayed by Hedaya, who portrayed Guy's character differently than Gari; on the television show, a 'healthy' Guy is frozen in humorous, almost statuesque states, whereas in the film, Hedaya's Guy is simply unconscious.

Reception

Box office
The film opened in two venues on June 28, 2006, earning $43,141 in its debut and ranking #42 in the North American box office and fifth among the week's new releases. Its widest number of theaters being 109, the film ended its run on September 21, 2006, having grossed $2,072,645 domestically and $181,479 overseas for a worldwide total of $2,254,124.

Critical reception
, Strangers with Candy holds a 51% approval rating on Rotten Tomatoes based on 103 reviews, with an average rating of 5.90/10. The site's consensus states: "Occasionally funny, but little more than a jumbled, overextended episode of the TV show. Still, Candy devotees won't be disappointed." Metacritic reports a 57 out of 100 rating based on 28 critics, indicating "mixed or average reviews".

References

External links

 
 
 
 

2005 films
2005 comedy films
American comedy films
American independent films
2000s English-language films
Films based on television series
Films shot in New Jersey
Comedy Central films
Films scored by Marcelo Zarvos
Films directed by Paul Dinello
2000s American films